The Ochoco National Forest is located in the Ochoco Mountains in Central Oregon in the United States, north and east of the city of Prineville, location of the national forest headquarters. It encompasses  of rimrock, canyons, geologic oddities, dense pine forests, and high desert terrain, as well as the headwaters of the North Fork Crooked River.

In descending order of forestland area, it occupies lands within Crook, Harney, Wheeler, and Grant counties.  The national forest also administers the Crooked River National Grassland, which is in Jefferson County.

The Ochoco National Forest is composed of three ranger districts:
Crooked River National Grassland, managed from the Paulina district office with a visitor center in Madras.
Paulina and Lookout Mountain Ranger Districts, based in Prineville. The former Rager Ranger Station in Paulina has been closed. The former Snow Mountain Ranger District is now administered by the Malheur National Forest, as part of the Emigrant Creek Ranger District.

Wilderness
The forest contains three wilderness areas comprising :
Mill Creek Wilderness at 
Bridge Creek Wilderness at 
Black Canyon Wilderness at

Recreation
Popular recreational activities in the Ochoco National Forest include hiking, fishing, camping, hunting, horseback riding, stargazing, birding, rock hounding, kayaking, and rock climbing.

References

External links

Ochoco National Forest, Crooked River National Grassland

 
Protected areas of Crook County, Oregon
Protected areas of Grant County, Oregon
National Forests of Oregon
Protected areas of Wheeler County, Oregon
1911 establishments in Oregon
Protected areas established in 1911